Catocala insolabilis, the inconsolable underwing, is a moth of the family Erebidae. The species was first described by Achille Guenée in 1852. It is found in North America from Ontario through Maine and Connecticut south to Florida, west through Arkansas to Texas and Oklahoma and north to South Dakota.

The wingspan is 65–75 mm. Adults are on wing from June to August depending on the location. There is one generation per year.

The larvae feed on Carya species.

References

External links
Species info

insolabilis
Moths of North America
Moths described in 1852